The Immanuel Church is a church building in Norrköping, Sweden. It was built by the Immanuel Church Congregation in 1956. Since 2020 it is owned by the two congregations Baptistförsamlingen Saron-Korskyrkan (affiliated to Evangelical Free Church in Sweden) and Norrköping Vineyard (affiliated to Vineyard Nordic), with Immanuel Church Congregation still active in it.

The Immanuel Church Congregation belongs to the Uniting Church in Sweden. It earlier belonged to the Mission Covenant Church of Sweden. It previously had a church building inaugurated on 28 December 1884.

References

External links
official website 

20th-century churches in Sweden
Churches in Östergötland County
Buildings and structures in Norrköping
Churches completed in 1956
Uniting Church in Sweden churches